The Entertainer (Amersham) Ltd. is the UK's largest independent toy retailer, which operates more than 170 stores. The company was founded by the husband and wife team Catherine and Gary Grant in 1981, when Gary purchased a local toy shop in Amersham, Buckinghamshire, England.

The Entertainer is part of TEAL Group Holdings, a family of brands which also includes Addo and Early Learning Centre.

History
The Entertainer began when Gary Grant took over The Pram and Toy Bar located in Amersham, in 1981. Grant's wife Catherine came up with the name The Entertainer In 1985, they purchased their second shop, located Beaconsfield. In April 1991, ten years after the acquisition of the toy shop in Amersham, the chain opened its third shop in Slough, although this has since closed. The company then underwent massive expansion and, by 2001, the chain had opened its 25th shop, located in the Victoria Centre in Nottingham. The Entertainer now also has many concessions within Matalan under the branding name Totally Toys. As of 2020 they near 100 concessions.

In February 2019, The Entertainer purchased Early Learning Centre, with 520 international franchise outlets.

Store details
Branches of The Entertainer opened before around 2002 generally have signage bearing the name 'The Entertainer', often alongside the legend "[location]'s Toy Shop" (e.g., "Amersham's Toy Shop"). Stores from this period characteristically had a 'shopping aisle' format.

In about 2003, a new store format was devised in an effort to modernise the chain, even though Grant was initially reluctant at the time of the opening of the new flagship store in bullring in Birmingham. The company's primary colour was changed from red to blue, with the company's name now inscribed in the font VAG Rounded. Stores now have a more complex layout with false protruding walls and curved shelving gondolas. New stores often have the company's new slogan 'Mad About Toys' inscribed on the store's fascia.

The Entertainer stores do not open on Sundays.

References

External links
 

Amersham
Retail companies established in 1981
Retail companies of the United Kingdom
Toy companies of the United Kingdom
Toy retailers of the United Kingdom